Yumnam Gopi Singh (born 1 February 1999) is an Indian professional footballer who plays as a midfielder or winger for NEROCA in the I-League.

Career
Born to a Hindu Meitei family in Manipur, Singh began his career with local side NEROCA in the I-League. He made his professional debut for the club on 1 December 2017 against Minerva Punjab. He started and played 50 minutes as NEROCA lost 2–1.

On 25 May 2018, Singh signed with ATK of the Indian Super League. Mid-way through the season, Singh was replaced in the senior squad by Ashish Pradhan. Singh then appeared for ATK Reserves as captain in their opening I-League 2nd Division match against Mohammedan. He then scored his first goal of the season for ATK Reserves on 23 January 2019 against Jamshedpur Reserves. His 42nd minute goal was the second in a 2–0 victory.

Career statistics

Club

References

1999 births
Living people
People from Thoubal district
Indian footballers
NEROCA FC players
ATK (football club) players
Association football midfielders
Footballers from Manipur
I-League players
I-League 2nd Division players
Bhawanipore FC players
East Bengal Club players
FC Bengaluru United players
Mohammedan SC (Kolkata) players